Ramma is a village in Järva Parish, Järva County in northern-central Estonia.

Ramma is the birthplace of botanist Kaljo Pork (1930-1981).

References

 

Villages in Järva County
Kreis Jerwen